Krim may refer to:

Places 
 Crimea, or Krim in Ukrainian, a peninsula in Eastern Europe
 Port Krym
 De Krim, a village in Overijssel, Netherlands
 Mount Krim, a mountain in Slovenia

People
Arthur J. Krim, geographer and architectural historian
Arthur B. Krim (1910–1994), American entertainment executive and Democratic Party official 
Donald Krim (1945–2011), American film distributor
Jacqueline Krim, American physicist
John Krim, German-Russian-American craftsman
Lucia and Leo Krim, American siblings killed by their nanny in 2012 in New York City
Mathilde Krim (1926 –2018), American medical researcher
Norman Krim (1913–2011), American electronics engineer and engineering executive
Seymour Krim (1922–1989), American author, editor and literary critic
Tariq Krim (born 1972) French entrepreneur
Krim Belkacem (1922–1970), Algerian revolutionary fighter

Other uses
Krim language, spoken in Sierra Leone
NK Krim, a Slovenian football club
RK Krim, a Slovenian handball club
KRIM-LP (96.3 FM), a radio station in Payson, Arizona
KRiMZ, in-game id of Freddy Johnson, Swedish professional Counter-Strike player
Black Krim, a tomato cultivar

See also

Crim (disambiguation)
Krym (disambiguation)
Krim Krim, a sub-prefecture of Logone Occidental Region in Chad
Karim, a given name and surname of Arabic origin
Abd el-Krim (1882–1963), Moroccan political and military leader
Krims, a surname